Quinneys is a 1919 British silent romance film directed by Herbert Brenon, Maurice Elvey, and Rex Wilson and stars Henry Ainley, Isobel Elsom and Eric Harrison. It is an adaptation of the play Quinneys  by Horace Annesley Vachell which was again made into a film in 1927.

A reported £100,000 worth of props were used for the film.

Plot
An antique dealer's daughter loves a foreman who sells fakes to his ex-partner.

Cast
 Henry Ainley as Joseph Quinney 
 Isobel Elsom as Posy Quinney 
 Eric Harrison as James Miggott 
 Tom Reynolds as Sam Tomlin 
 Roland Pertwee as Cyrus Hunsucker 
 Marie Wright as Mabel Dredge

References

Bibliography
 Bamford, Kenton. Distorted Images: British National Identity and Film in the 1920s. I.B. Tauris, 1999.

External links

1919 films
British silent feature films
1910s romance films
1910s English-language films
Films directed by Rex Wilson
British black-and-white films
British romance films
1910s British films
English-language romance films